"Maid of Athens, ere we part" is a poem by Lord Byron, written in 1810 and dedicated to a young girl of Athens.  It begins:

 
Each stanza of the poem ends with the same Greek refrain, which Byron translated as "My life, I love you!". It may be viewed as an example of macaronic verse, although it lacks the humorous intent typical of that genre.

History of the poem
According to C. G. Brouzas, Byron's "Maid of Athens" was born Teresa Makri, in 1797. She was the daughter of Tasia Makri, at whose house Byron lodged briefly in 1809 and in February 1810. Byron apparently fell in love with the 12-year-old girl; in a letter to Henry Drury the poet declares to be "dying for love of three Greek Girls at Athens", "Teresa, Mariana, and Kattinka", and wrote the poem for her before departing for Constantinople. On his way back from Turkey to the Morea, on 17 July 1810, he stayed at Mrs. Makri's house for another ten days. At some point he offered £500 for the girl – an offer which evidently was not accepted. 

Byron never met Teresa again. She eventually married James Black (1803–1868) and died impoverished in 1875 in Athens, Greece.

Musical settings
The poem has been set to music by numerous composers, including Charles Gounod, William Horsley, and Henry Robinson Allen. Isaac Nathan's rendition appears in an album "the best songs of the world".

References

External links
 The poem's full text at Wikisource
 

Poetry by Lord Byron
Works about Greece